Buček is a surname. Notable people with the surname include:

 Antonín Buček (born 1984), Czech footballer
 Juraj Buček (born 1973), Slovak footballer
 Martin Buček (born 1986), Czech ice hockey player

See also
 Addy Bucek (born 1960), Australian sailor